Quentin Halys and Tristan Lamasine were the defending champions but only Halys chose to defend his title, partnering Lucas Pouille. Halys lost in the quarterfinals to Purav Raja and Tristan-Samuel Weissborn.

Lloyd Glasspool and Matt Reid won the title after defeating Denys Molchanov and Sergiy Stakhovsky 6–3, 6–4 in the final.

Seeds

Draw

References

External links
 Main draw

Biella Challenger Indoor IV - Doubles